Thaddeus Hanford, Jr. (1847–1892) was an American newspaper editor.

Hanford was the eldest son of Seattle pioneers Edward and Abby Hanford and the older brother of Cornelius H. Hanford. He work as an editor of the Daily Intelligencer and bought the newspaper in 1878. Later it was renamed in Seattle Post-Intelligencer.

Thaddeus Hanford died on January 29, 1892, and was buried at Lake View Cemetery, Seattle.

External links 
 
 Weekly Intelligencer, a precursor of the Seattle Post-Intelligencer, publishes its first edition on August 5, 1867 (historylink.org)
 Seattle Post-Intelligencer (1863-2009) (historylink.org)

American newspaper editors
American male journalists
1847 births
1892 deaths
19th-century American journalists
19th-century American male writers
Seattle Post-Intelligencer people